The Derung (also spelt Drung or Dulong) people are an ethnic group. They form one of the 56 ethnic groups officially recognized by China. Their population of 6,000 is found in the Nujiang Lisu Autonomous Prefecture of Yunnan in the Derung Valley of Gongshan Derung and Nu Autonomous County. Another 600 can be found east of the Dulong valley, living in the mountains above the Nu River (Salween River) near the village of Binzhongluo in northern Gongshan Derung and Nu Autonomous County.

Language 
The Derung speak the Derung language, one of the Sino-Tibetan languages. Their language is unwritten; in the past the Derung have transmitted messages and have made records by making notches on wooden logs.

History 
There are few documents about the origins of the Derung. It is known, nevertheless, that during the period of the Tang dynasty, the Derung were under the jurisdiction of Nanzhao and the Dali Kingdom. The Derung Valley area, the southernmost part of Tsawarong, was known by the Tibetans as Changyul or Kiongyul, meaning the "valley of beer" because Derung people enjoy drinking.
From the Yuan dynasty to the Qing dynasty, the Derung were governed by the local Tibetan or Nakhi rulers. They also paid yearly tribute to China; the local Lama, called Changputong, was in charge of sending it to Weixi. In 1913, the Derung helped to repel a British attack in the area. Prior to 1949 there were several other names used for this ethnic group; they were known as Qiao during the Yuan and Qiu and Qu during the Qing.

Culture 
Prior to the formation of the People's Republic of China, Derung society was based on a system of clans. A total of 15 clans existed, called nile; each one of them was formed by diverse familiar communities. Each clan divided itself into ke'eng, towns in which the Derung lived in common houses. Marriages between clans were prohibited.

The typical dress of the women consists of a dress made of fabric lined with colors black and white. Formerly, the women used to tattoo their faces when they reached the age of twelve or thirteen. The tattoos of some women resembled masculine mustaches.

Houses are usually constructed out of wood. They are two stories in height; the second floor is designed as the living quarters for the family whereas the first level serves as a barn and stable. When a male member of the family is married, a new section is added to the family's house where he and his new wife will live in.

Religion 
Although some Derung have converted to Christianity, the vast majority continue to believe in their animist native religion. There is a belief that all creatures have their own souls. Usually diverse sacrifices are made in order to calm down the malignant spirits.
The role of the shaman is of great importance since they are the ones in charge of the rituals. During the celebrations of the Derung New Year, which is celebrated in the month of December of the lunar calendar, diverse animal sacrifices are celebrated to make an offering to the sky.

Gallery

See also
 Taron people of Myanmar.
 Nung Rawang of Sagaing.

References

 Sūn Hóngkāi 孙宏开: Dúlóngyǔ jiǎnzhì 独龙语简志 (Introduction to the Derung Language; Běijīng 北京, Mínzú chūbǎnshè 民族出版社 1982).
 Tyler, Leisa (July 4, 2005). "Into the Valley". Time.
 People's Daily: The Drung ethnic minority
The Drung ethnic minority (Chinese government site)
Asia harvest ethnic profile
  Centralisation et intégration du système égalitaire Drung sous l’influence des pouvoirs voisins (Yunnan-Chine), Stéphane GROS, Péninsule 35, 1997
  Du politique au pittoresque en Chine. A propos des Dulong, nationalité minoritaire du Yunnan, Stéphane Gros, 2001

External links

Last tattooed women of the Dulong people (China News Wrap, English)
Last tattooed women of the Dulong people (Original Chinese article, with larger number of photographs)
Paul Knoll description with photographs

Ethnic groups officially recognized by China